Alexis FitzGerald is the name of:

Alexis FitzGerald Snr (1916–1985), Irish solicitor and Fine Gael Senator
His nephew Alexis FitzGerald Jnr (1945–2015), former Irish Fine Gael politician, TD and Senator